Tenthredopsis is a genus of common sawflies belonging to the family Tenthredinidae subfamily Tenthrediniinae. These sawflies are present in most of Europe.

Species

 Tenthredopsis albonotata  (Brullé, 1832) 
 Tenthredopsis annuligera  (Tischbein, 1846) 
 Tenthredopsis auriculata  C. G. Thomson, 1870 
 Tenthredopsis balcana  (Mocsáry, 1880) 
 Tenthredopsis benthini  Rudow, 1871 
 Tenthredopsis cabrerae  Konow, 1898 
 Tenthredopsis carinata Malaise, 1931 
 Tenthredopsis coquebertii  (Klug, 1817) 
 Tenthredopsis corcyrensis  (Ed. André, 1881) 
 Tenthredopsis crassiuscula  A. Costa, 1894 
 Tenthredopsis floricola  Costa, 1859 
 Tenthredopsis friesei  Konow, 1887 
 Tenthredopsis hungarica  (Klug, 1814) 
 Tenthredopsis kokuewi  Jakovlev, 1891 
 Tenthredopsis lactiflua  (Klug, 1814) 
 Tenthredopsis ligata  Konow, 1903 
 Tenthredopsis litterata  (Geoffroy, 1785) 
 Tenthredopsis macedonica  Cingovski, 1958 
 Tenthredopsis moscovita  (Ed. André, 1881) 
 Tenthredopsis nassata  (Linnaeus, 1767) 
 Tenthredopsis nebrodensis  A. Costa, 1894 
 Tenthredopsis nigella  Konow, 1891 
 Tenthredopsis nivosa  (Klug, 1817) 
 Tenthredopsis ornata  (Serville, 1823) 
 Tenthredopsis ornatrix  Konow, 1890 
 Tenthredopsis putoni  Konow, 1886 
 Tenthredopsis quadriforis  Konow, 1898 
 Tenthredopsis quadriguttata  A. Costa, 1859 
 Tenthredopsis romana  Konow, 1894 
 Tenthredopsis scutellaris  (Fabricius, 1798) 
 Tenthredopsis semirufa  Kriechbaumer, 1884 
 Tenthredopsis sordida  (Klug, 1814) 
 Tenthredopsis stigma  (Fabricius, 1798) 
 Tenthredopsis tarsata  (Fabricius, 1804) 
 Tenthredopsis tessellata  (Klug, 1817) 
 Tenthredopsis tischbeinii  (Frivaldszky, 1876)

Gallery

References

Tenthredinidae